Enemy Swim is an unincorporated community and census-designated place (CDP) on the Lake Traverse Indian Reservation in Day County, South Dakota, United States. The population was 310 at the 2020 census. It was first listed as a CDP prior to the 2020 census.

It is in the eastern part of the county, surrounding the west cove of Enemy Swim Lake and extending south to include the northwest shore of Campbell Slough.

Demographics

References 

Census-designated places in Day County, South Dakota
Census-designated places in South Dakota